Marines, Let's Go is a 1961 CinemaScope DeLuxe Color Korean War film about three Marine buddies (Tom Tryon, David Hedison and Tom Reese) on shore leave in Japan and at war in Korea. It was produced and directed by Raoul Walsh, who also wrote the story. Walsh had previously had successes with films about the U.S. Marine Corps in World War I (What Price Glory?), the 1920s (The Cock-Eyed World and Sadie Thompson), and World War II (Battle Cry). This was the next-to-last film of Walsh's long directing career.

Plot summary
In 1945, the Second World War is over, over 75 million people died all over the world. This is new era beginning of Cold War has only just begun is started, tension between the United States and Soviet Union.

Four privates romp their way through occupied Japan while on leave, finding a little romance and some laughs. After it's over they head to the front lines of the Korean War where brutality and death are constant. In September 11 to 15, 1950, the United Nations landing of Incheon into the South Korean only there a US 1st Marine Division always until reinforcements from the US 10th Corps into the Inchon, the division faced one of its most daunting challenges, deploying so hurriedly it still lacked its third infantry regiment and ordered to execute an amphibious assault under the worst tidal conditions they had ever faced. After the landing they moved north and after heavy fighting in Seoul they liberated the city.

Few days later, the armistice signed them official ceasefire ending of Korean War in July 27, 1953.

Cast
 Tom Tryon as Pfc. Roth
 David Hedison as Pfc. Chatfield
 Tom Reese as Pfc. McCaffrey
 Linda Hutchings as Grace
 Barbara Stuart as Ina
 David Brandon as Pvt. Newt Levels
 Steve Baylor as Pvt. Chase
 Peter Miller as Gunnery Sgt. Howard Hawkins
 Rachel Romen as Mrs. Ellen Hawkins (as Adoree Evans)
 Hideo Inamura as Pvt. Pete Kono
 Vince Williams as Hank Dyer (war correspondent)
 Fumiyo Fujimoto as Song Do (Chatfield's girl)
 Heihachirô Ôkawa as Yoshida (hotel manager)

Production
Walsh filmed the movie on location in Japan with extras from the US Marine Corps, who were pulled off filming due to the possibility of their being sent to Laos.  The film was completed in Okinawa.

The Marine technical advisor of the film was Colonel Jacob G. Goldberg (1911–2008), who served 30 years in the Marine Corps.

Reception
When the White House was interested in Warner Bros. making a film on John F. Kennedy's exploits as the commander of PT 109, Jack L. Warner sent a print of Marines, Let's Go to display Raoul Walsh's expertise for making the movie about Kennedy. The president hated the film, however, and Warner Bros. had to choose a new director for PT 109.

See also
 List of films featuring the United States Marine Corps

References

External links
 
 
 
 
 Howard Thompson, "'Marines, Let's Go!' Comes to Paramount" (review), The New York Times, August 16, 1961.
 

1961 films
1960s English-language films
CinemaScope films
20th Century Fox films
Films about the United States Marine Corps
Korean War films
Films set in the 1950s
Films directed by Raoul Walsh
Military humor in film
American war comedy films
1960s American films